Illinois has a variety of protected areas, including 123 state protected areas - state parks, wildlife areas, recreation areas, nature reserves, and state forests. There are also federal and local level protected areas in the state. These levels interact to provide a variety of recreation opportunities and conservation schemes, sometimes in a small area. For instance,  Shabbona Lake State Park lies in DeKalb County which has its own  forest preserve system, while the City of DeKalb has a  park system. 

One UNESCO World Heritage Site in Illinois, Cahokia, is protected as State owned historic site.  There are also two listings within the The 20th-Century Architecture of Frank Lloyd Wright World Heritage Site.

Overview
Illinois has a wide variety of state owned and administered protected areas: state parks, state forests, state recreation areas, state fish and wildlife areas, state natural areas, and one state trail. They are all administered by the Illinois Department of Natural Resources. In addition, several of the state historic sites, administered by its Illinois Historic Preservation Division, also include nature reserves.  There is one UNESCO World Heritage Site, Cahokia, and two listings within the The 20th-Century Architecture of Frank Lloyd Wright World Heritage Site.

There is also a national forest, Shawnee National Forest, a national grassland, Midewin National Tallgrass Prairie, and several other sites administered by the National Park Service, including portions of National Trails. There are also National Wildlife Refuges.

Federal protected areas

U.S. Wilderness Areas
Bald Knob Wilderness
Bay Creek Wilderness
Burden Falls Wilderness
Clear Springs Wilderness
Crab Orchard Wilderness
Garden of the Gods Wilderness
Lusk Creek Wilderness
Panther Den Wilderness

National Forest Service
Midewin National Tallgrass Prairie -  
Shawnee National Forest -

United States Fish and Wildlife Service
 Chautauqua National Wildlife Refuge
 Crab Orchard National Wildlife Refuge -  including the  Crab Orchard Wilderness
 Cypress Creek National Wildlife Refuge
 Emiquon National Wildlife Refuge
 Hackmatack National Wildlife Refuge
 Mark Twain National Wildlife Refuge Complex
 Meredosia National Wildlife Refuge
 Middle Mississippi River National Wildlife Refuge
 Two Rivers National Wildlife Refuge

National Park Service
The Parks Service operates the federally owned Lincoln Home National Historic Site in Springfield, Illinois, the Pullman National Historical Park in Chicago, and the New Philadelphia National Historic Site in Pike County in rural western Illinois. The Chicago Portage National Historic Site is an NPS-affiliated site which is located in the Forest Preserve District of Cook County.  In addition, the NPS partners with the Abraham Lincoln National Heritage Area.

U.S. Army Corps of Engineers
Illinois Waterway

Wetlands (Ramsar Convention)
Areas designated as wetlands of international importance under the Ramsar Convention:
Cache River-Cypress Creek Wetlands
Chiwaukee Prairie Illinois Beach Lake Plain (shared with Wisconsin)
The Emiquon Complex
Dixon Waterfowl Refuge
Upper Mississippi (shared with Iowa, Minnesota, and Wisconsin)

Current state parks
State parks are owned by the state and generally administered by the Illinois Department of Natural Resources.

Historic preservation
Around 50 usually smaller sites concerning historic structures are owned by the state and administered by the Illinois Historic Preservation Division, some of which may have a nature preservation component, including the Cahokia World Heritage Site and Lincoln's New Salem.

Local level parks
A variety of county and town protected areas exist in Illinois, including city park districts and county-wide Forest Preserve Districts, as well as land owned by private organizations. Most counties lack a public landholding agency, but below are the landholdings of such districts in Illinois:

Boone County Conservation District - 
Byron Forest Preserve District - 
Champaign County Forest Preserve District - 
Forest Preserve District of Cook County - 
DeKalb County Forest Preserve - 
Forest Preserve District of DuPage County - 
Forest Preserve District of Kane County - 
Forest Preserves of the Kankakee River Valley - 
Kendall County Forest Preserve District - 
Lake County Forest Preserve - 
Macon County Conservation District - 
McHenry County Conservation District - 
Putnam Country Conservation District - 
Rock Island Forest Preserve District - 
Vermilion County Conservation District - 
Forest Preserve District of Will County - 
Winnebago County Forest Preserve District -

References

External links
Illinois Department of Natural Resources
Recreation.gov

Protected areas
Illinois
Protected